Sinaba Stadium is a multi-use stadium in Benoni, South Africa.  It is currently used mostly for football matches and was the home ground of Benoni Premier United.  The stadium holds 15,000 people. It underwent a major upgrade during 2009 as it had been chosen as a training facility during the 2010 FIFA world cup in South Africa.

External links
Stadium image

Soccer venues in South Africa
Sports venues in Gauteng
Ekurhuleni